Homoeosoma stypticellum is a species of snout moth in the genus Homoeosoma. It was described by Augustus Radcliffe Grote in 1878. It is found in North America, including Alberta, Illinois, Massachusetts, Minnesota, North Carolina, Oklahoma, South Carolina, Tennessee, Washington and West Virginia.

References

Moths described in 1878
Phycitini